The Man Called Noon is a 1973 film directed by Peter Collinson. It stars Richard Crenna and Stephen Boyd. It is based on a 1970 Louis L'Amour novel of the same name.

Cast
 Richard Crenna as Noon, a gunman who develops amnesia after an attempted assassination.
 Stephen Boyd as Rimes, a dangerous outlaw who becomes Noon's companion
 Rosanna Schiaffino as Fan Davidge, a woman in danger who falls for Noon
 Farley Granger as Judge Niland, a scheming man who covets Noon's hidden fortune
 Patty Shepard as Peg Cullane, a woman who plots against Noon
 Ángel del Pozo as Ben Janish
 Howard Ross as Bayles
 Aldo Sambrell as Kissling
 José Jaspe as Henneker
 Carlos Bravo as Lang (credited as Charlie Bravo)
 Ricardo Palacios as Brakeman

References

External links

1973 films
1973 Western (genre) films
Spanish Western (genre) films
Films directed by Peter Collinson
Films based on American novels
Films based on Western (genre) novels
Films about amnesia
Films shot in Almería
English-language Spanish films
1970s English-language films